Swarovski may refer to:

 Swarovski AG, manufacturer of cut lead glass
 Swarovski Optik, a subsidiary
 FC Swarovski Tirol, an Austrian football club (1986–1992)

See also
Svárovský